Erythrops elegans is a species of crustaceans in the family Mysidae. It is found in the northeastern Atlantic Ocean and in the Mediterranean Sea.

References 

Mysida
Crustaceans of the Atlantic Ocean
Fauna of the Mediterranean Sea
Crustaceans described in 1869
Taxa named by Georg Ossian Sars